Rod Oram is a New Zealand journalist writing on corporate, economic and political issues. He is a columnist for The Sunday Star-Times, a regular broadcaster on radio and television and a frequent public speaker. He is an adjunct professor in the business school at Unitec in Auckland and he has contributed to several regional economic development projects.

Biography
Rod Oram was born in the United Kingdom.

He spent 20 years as an international financial journalist in Europe and North America, and travelled extensively in those continents and in Asia. From 1975–1979 Rod held various journalist positions in Canada and from 1979–1997 he held a variety of posts at the Financial Times, London and New York City.

In 1997 he and his family emigrated to New Zealand, where he was editor of the Business Herald section of The New Zealand Herald from 1997–2000. Oram was a triple award-winner at the 2004 Qantas Media Awards; as business columnist of the year, business feature writer of the year and winner of the NZTE travel scholarship for his writing on innovation in New Zealand.

In the 2006 Westpac Business & Financial Journalism Awards Oram won the Reporting on Corporate Responsibility, Sustainability or Community Engagement category.

Penguin published Oram’s book about the New Zealand economy, Reinventing Paradise, in August 2007. 

In August 2016, Oram's book Three Cities: Seeking Hope in the Anthropocene was published by Bridget Williams Books.

References

External links
Rod Oram's columns at The Sunday Star-Times

New Zealand journalists
Living people
British emigrants to New Zealand
Year of birth missing (living people)